The twelfth season of Dancing with the Stars premiered on 15 April 2012, at the 6:30pm time slot on Channel Seven. With previous co-host Sonia Kruger defecting to Channel Nine, former Spice Girl and American Dancing with the Stars season 5 runner up Mel B was hired as her replacement. Daniel MacPherson continues his role as main host of the show, along with judges Todd McKenney, Helen Richey, and Joshua Horner.

Background 
The cast for the season were revealed on 13 March 2012 via the Seven website, along with their professional partners, although four contestants were revealed in late February 2012. This cast has been seen as a star increase on the previous year's cast, particularly with the addition of new international co-host Mel B, and former Nine daytime talkshow host Kerri-Anne Kennerley. Six new professional dancers, including former American Dancing with the Stars professional Damian Whitewood, Christopher Page, Elena Samodanova, Jess Prince, Gleb Savchenko and Damien Samuel have been recruited to replace non-returning professional dancers Alana Patience, Brendon Midson, Arsen Kishishian, Masha Belash, Jade Brand and Mark Hodge.

Couples

Dance schedule
The celebrities and professional partners will dance one of these routines for each corresponding week.

Week 1: Cha-cha-cha or Viennese Waltz
Week 2: Jive or Foxtrot
Week 3: One unlearned dance (Personal Song/Story week)
Week 4: One unlearned dance (Australian Music week)
Week 5: One unlearned dance (Broadway Week)
Week 6: One unlearned dance and Dance Off (Movies/Musicals Week)
Week 7: One unlearned dance and Team Dances
Week 8: One unlearned ballroom and Instant Latin dance
Week 9: One unlearned dance and Argentine Tango
Week 10: Redemption dance, Cha-cha-cha Face-off and Freestyle

Judges scores

Red numbers indicate the lowest score for each week.
Green numbers indicate the highest score for each week.
 indicates the couple eliminated that week.
 indicates the couple withdrew from the competition.
 indicates the returning couple that finished in the bottom two.
 indicates the returning couple that was the last to be called safe.
 indicates the winning couple.
 indicates the runner-up couple.
 indicates the third-place couple.

Averages 
This table only counts for dances scored on a traditional 30-points scale.

Highest and lowest scoring performances 
The best and worst performances in each dance according to the judges' marks are as follows:

Couples' Highest and Lowest Scoring Dances
According to the traditional 30-point scale.

Dance Chart
The celebrities and professional partners danced one of these routines for each corresponding week:
 Week 1: Cha-cha-cha or Viennese Waltz
 Week 2: Jive or Foxtrot
 Week 3: One Unlearned Dance (Personal Song/Story Week)
 Week 4: One Unlearned Dance (Australian Music Week)
 Week 5: One Unlearned Dance (Broadway Week)
 Week 6: One Unlearned Dance & Jive Marathon (Movies Week)
 Week 7: One Unlearned Dance & Males vs. Females Team Cha-cha-cha
 Week 8: One Unlearned Ballroom Dance & Instant Latin Dance
 Week 9: Argentine Tango & One Unlearned Latin Dance
 Week 10: Redemption Dance, Cha-cha-cha Face-Off, & Freestyle
 Highest scoring dance
 Lowest scoring dance
 Danced, but not scored

Running order
Unless indicated otherwise, individual judges scores in the chart below (given in parentheses) are listed in this order from left to right: Todd McKenney, Helen Richey, Joshua Horner.

Week 1 

Running order

Week 2 
Running order

Week 3: Personal Song/Story Week 
Running order

Week 4: Australian Music Week 
Running order

Week 5: Broadway Week 
Running order

Week 6: Movies/Musicals Week 
Running order

Week 7: Team Dances Week 
Running order

Week 8: Instant Dances Week 
Running order

Week 9: Semi-Finals Week 
Running order

Week 10: Grand Finale Week 
Running order

References 

Season 12
2012 Australian television seasons